Arboridia is a genus of true bugs belonging to the family Cicadellidae.

The genus was first described by Zachvatkin in 1946.

The species of this genus are found in Europe and Northern America.

Species:
 Arboridia kermanshah (Dlabola, 1963)
 Arboridia parvula (Boheman, 1845)

References

Erythroneurini
Cicadellidae genera